"I Run This" is the third single from Birdman's third studio album 5 * Stunna.  It features Lil Wayne. It is produced by T-Mix. Lil Jon, Brisco, DJ Drama and Glasses Malone make cameo appearances in the video. BET's 106 & Park premiered it all day on May 14, 2008.

Now-retired baseball player Ryan Sweeney used "I Run This" as his walk-up song before he batted while he was a member of the Oakland Athletics from 2008-2011.

Remix
A remix has surfaced on the web, although the only change is a new verse performed by Lil Wayne. This version of the song was used for the music video instead of the original.

Charts

References

2007 songs
2008 singles
Birdman (rapper) songs
Lil Wayne songs
Cash Money Records singles
Song recordings produced by Drumma Boy
Songs written by Lil Wayne
Songs written by Birdman (rapper)
Music videos directed by Dale Resteghini